In Another Country is a 2012 South Korean comedy-drama film written and directed by Hong Sang-soo. Set in a seaside town, the film consists of three parts that tell the story of three women, all named Anne and all played by French actress Isabelle Huppert. The film competed for the Palme d'Or at the 2012 Cannes Film Festival. The film was selected as part of the 2013 Hong Kong International Film Festival.

Plot 
The framing story has young film student, Won-joo (Jung Yu-mi) and her mother Park Sook (Youn Yuh-jung) hiding from their debtors in Mohang, a seaside town in Buan, North Jeolla. The bored younger woman sets out to write a screenplay whose plot will use the place they're staying in for the location, but eventually comes up with three variants, using the same basic idea in all of them.

In each case, Won-joo's protagonist is a "charming French visitor" named Anne (Isabelle Huppert): in the first section, she's a famous filmmaker visiting a fellow Korean director Jong-soo (Kwon Hae-hyo) and his very pregnant and jealous wife Geum-hee (Moon So-ri); in the second, she's the wife of a French motor company executive who comes to the same guesthouse to meet her lover, a Korean filmmaker, Moon-soo (Moon Sung-keun); in the third, she's a divorced housewife who arrives with her university lecturer friend Park Soon (again Youn Yuh-jung) for some peace and quiet, after her husband left her for his young Korean secretary.

Issues of infidelity are present in each story, as is a dim but muscular lifeguard (Yoo Jun-sang) whom Anne meets while strolling on the beach and looking (in all three episodes) for a mini-lighthouse.

As each "Anne" interacts with the locals, including Won-joo, who works at Anne's lodging and helps show her around, certain faces, situations and lines of dialogue recur, their effect and implications changing depending on context and delivery.

Cast
 Isabelle Huppert as Anne
 Yoo Jun-sang as a lifeguard
 Kwon Hae-hyo as Jong-soo
 Moon So-ri as Geum-hee
 Moon Sung-keun as Moon-soo
 Jung Yu-mi as Won-joo
 Youn Yuh-jung as Park Sook
 Kim Yong-ok as a bhikkhu

Production 
Isabelle Huppert first met Hong Sang-soo at the Paris Cinémathèque in March 2011 at a retrospective of his films. She says, "I think the idea was already in his head, perhaps, the desire to work together."

Seoul, 2011. Huppert's photo exhibition La femme aux portraits (Woman of Many Faces) had just been unveiled and her film Copacabana was released in theaters. The actress came to Korea for the occasion and had meetings with the film directors she had always wanted to meet—namely Park Chan-wook, Lee Chang-dong, Bong Joon-ho, Im Sang-soo and of course, Hong. According to Hong, Huppert's casting happened when they were drinking makgeolli (a brewed Korean rice wine) at a restaurant in Seoul, a place that has often appeared in his films. Not expecting much, and in a casual tone that may have even sounded like a joke, he spoke to Huppert. "I’m about to start a new film. Nothing about it has been decided yet. Would you like to be in it?" Then came an astonishing reaction from her: "Yes!" Huppert replied without even a second of hesitation. "The film came to be what it is now when Isabelle decided to join it," says Hong. At the end of June, she came to Korea by herself to begin filming.

Huppert let herself be transported by a project without a script and was delighted to play the game, traveling to a beach town, Mohang, South Korea, in a very rainy season. "I don’t know all his films, but I think he always works the same way. He starts with the place, finds the people, and only then, writes the script. So it gives an enigmatic cast to everything — and to the way we work. He has a curious, atypical relationship to his film. He’s very exacting, and precise, and there are lots of takes, he’s not ever in a rush," Huppert said. She said she adored working in foreign countries, and the cast and crew "all spoke Korean, and English was the only language I could speak with them; this added to the strangeness. In Korea, I was really alone, and it felt good. It was a very intimate shoot. He’s a director who likes to shoot close up. Only a few weeks of shooting, but he works both fast and slow, in the sense that there are a lot of takes. Each filmmaker has his own rhythm, yet I had the impression that he was very surefooted. He filmed me in profile or from the back, like a figure in the landscape. I love the way he filmed me, just like any other woman in the landscape." Huppert said she loved the adventurous aspect to making this movie. "And adventure is at the vital center of the story."

Reception

Critical reception
On review aggregator website Rotten Tomatoes, the film has an approval rating of 83% based on 24 reviews, and an average rating of 6.7/10. On Metacritic, the film has a weighted average score of 69 out of 100, based on 13 critics, indicating "generally favorable reviews".

Awards and nominations 
2012 Buil Film Awards
Nomination – Best Film
Nomination – Best Director – Hong Sang-soo
Nomination – Best Actor – Yoo Jun-sang
Nomination – Best Actress – Isabelle Huppert
Nomination – Best Supporting Actress – Moon So-ri

2012 Grand Bell Awards
Nomination – Best Supporting Actor – Yoo Jun-sang

See also
 Isabelle Huppert on screen and stage

References

External links 
  
 
 
 

2012 films
2012 independent films
2012 comedy-drama films
South Korean independent films
South Korean drama films
Adultery in films
Films about interracial romance
Films directed by Hong Sang-soo
2010s Korean-language films
English-language South Korean films
Sponge Entertainment films
2010s English-language films
2012 multilingual films
South Korean multilingual films
2010s South Korean films